Yvonne Hudson (born July 9, 1955) is an American television actress who is best known for being the first African-American female cast member on Saturday Night Live. She joined the cast as a featured player in the show's 1980–1981 season. (The first black female repertory player was Danitra Vance.) She is also the third African-American to become an SNL cast member following Garrett Morris and Eddie Murphy. Hudson first appeared on the show in 1978 as an uncredited extra in many episodes.

Hudson rarely had a role of significance and was fired along with most of the cast at the end of the troubled season. However, she continued to appear occasionally in uncredited small roles until her final appearance on the show in 1984. Apart from her stint on SNL, Hudson has not appeared in any other television or film role.

References

External links

African-American actresses
American television actresses
1954 births
Living people
American women comedians
American sketch comedians
21st-century African-American people
21st-century African-American women
20th-century African-American people
20th-century African-American women